Anabarilius andersoni is a species of cyprinid fish that is endemic to China. It is a pelagic species only known from Xingyun Lake in Yunnan, and its population is severely impacted by domestic pollution and overfishing.

References

Anabarilius
Endemic fauna of Yunnan
Freshwater fish of China
Cyprinid fish of Asia
Fish described in 1904
 01